Garbage Warrior is a 2007 American film about architect Mike Reynolds, inventor of the Earthship style of building, directed by Oliver Hodge.

Plot
It follows Reynolds and how he developed the Earthship style of building and his struggle with the laws of Taos, New Mexico, the location of his experimental Earthship community, in order to be allowed to build homes that do not match the structures of local building codes. 

The film concludes with a postscript showing Reynolds and his team of builders travelling to the Andaman Islands in the aftermath of the Boxing Day tsunami to assist the locals with disaster recovery and teaching them how to construct extremely low-cost earthships.

References

External links
 

Sustainable building
2007 films
Documentary films about architecture
2000s English-language films
Films set in New Mexico
Films set in the Andaman and Nicobar Islands
2000s American films